Khazar University (which directly translates as Caspian University) is a private university located in Baku, Azerbaijan.

Campuses
Khazar University owns four campuses in the city of Baku and two campuses in regions of Azerbaijan. 

 Neftchilar Campus 
 Downtown Campus 
 Baku Dunya School Campus – Education complex for “Dunya” School, also Khazar University School of Education's Internship Center, Sports Center, Dormitory and Technopark
 Sumgayit Dunya School Campus 
 Ganja Dunya School Campus
 Buzovna Conference and Leisure Center

Background information

Khazar University was founded in March 1991 by Hamlet Isakhanli, the university became one of the first private universities in Eastern Europe, the Caucasus and Central Asia and the first in Azerbaijan to introduce Western-style, research-oriented higher education. Isakhanli formed Khazar in the interest of reforming the previous system of higher education under Soviet rule.

Academic information
In Azerbaijan, Khazar University is providing Western-style education on all levels: undergraduate, graduate, and doctoral. Khazar University participates in foreign student exchange programs. It also runs a lab.

Departments

English Language and Literature

History and Archaeology

The Department of History and Archaeology was established in June 1993 and was formerly known as the Department of History. It falls within the School of Humanities, Education and Social Sciences.

Political Sciences and Philosophy

Institute of Politics 
The institute was formerly known as the Center for International and Strategic Studies.

Dictionary and Encyclopedia Center
The Khazar University Dictionary and Encyclopedia Center, located on the campus of Khazar University in Baku, Azerbaijan, has been in operation since April 1996.  The center is directed by Professor Tofik Abaskuliyev. The center's main functions are to perform linguistic and lexicological research and to prepare, evaluate and publish bilingual, multilingual and encyclopedic dictionaries.

Notable alumni
Adnan Hajizadeh, blogger and youth activist
Nargiz Birk-Petersen, television commentator
Nigar Jamal, winner of Eurovision 2011

Affiliations
The university is a member of the Caucasus University Association.

References

 
Schools of international relations
Technical universities and colleges in Azerbaijan
Engineering universities and colleges in Azerbaijan
Private universities and colleges
Science and technology in Azerbaijan
Educational institutions established in 1991
1991 establishments in Azerbaijan